Essendon Cricket Club is an Australian cricket club competing in the Victorian Premier Cricket competition. The club was first established in 1872. The club trains and plays at Windy Hill, Essendon, former training ground and administrative base of the Australian Football League team Essendon Football Club.

Honours

Club Championships 

 1965/66
 1967/68
 2018/19

Premierships 
Premierships for all teams in Victorian Premier Cricket.

See also
 The 1965-66 Victorian District Cricket final

References

1872 establishments in Australia
Sports clubs established in 1872
Cricket clubs established in 1872
Victorian Premier Cricket clubs
Cricket clubs in Melbourne
Cricket in Melbourne
Essendon, Victoria
Sport in the City of Moonee Valley